Six World Trade Center was an eight-story building in Lower Manhattan in New York City. It opened in 1974 and was the building in the World Trade Center complex that had the fewest stories.  The building served as the U.S. Customs House for New York. It was destroyed in 2001 due to the collapse of the North Tower during the September 11 attacks. It is not set to be replaced as part of the new World Trade Center. Its site is now the location of the new One World Trade Center.

History 
Six World Trade Center was first proposed in 1968 as part of the original World Trade Center complex. The building was designed by Minoru Yamasaki, along with Emery Roth & Sons. Construction was completed in 1973 on the eight-story building. Six World Trade Center was home to the U.S. Customs Service for the state of New York, from 1974 to 2001.

Tenants 

 Internal Revenue Service Inspection Service (Internal Affairs)
 United States Customs Service
 United States Department of Commerce
 Bureau of Alcohol, Tobacco and Firearms
 United States Department of Agriculture – Administrator, Animal and Plant Health Inspection Service (AAPHIS)
 United States Department of Labor
 The Peace Corps (New York Regional Office)
 Export-Import Bank of the United States
 Eastco Building Services (building management)

After September 11 and cleanup 
During the September 11 attacks, the collapse of the North Tower destroyed large sections of the Six World Trade Center.

The building's ruins were demolished to make way for reconstruction of the current World Trade Center site. AMEC Construction handled the demolition, in which the building was weakened and then pulled down with cables. The new One World Trade Center stands at the site where Six World Trade Center originally stood, with the latter not going to be rebuilt. The Performing Arts Center at the World Trade Center has been called "6 World Trade Center" since there is no building officially with that name.

Gallery

See also 
 Marriott World Trade Center

References

External links 

 Emporis entry on this building
 Tenants of 6 World Trade Center via CNN

1973 establishments in New York City
2001 disestablishments in New York (state)
Buildings and structures destroyed in the September 11 attacks
Federal buildings in the United States
Office buildings completed in 1973
Office buildings in Manhattan
World Trade Center